Kheyr Khujeh may refer to:
 Kheyr Khujeh-ye Najaf
 Kheyr Khujeh-ye Olya
 Kheyr Khujeh-ye Sofla